CVCA may refer to the following:

 Cuyahoga Valley Christian Academy
 China Venture Capital Association
 Chicago Vocational Career Academy